The Hokuriku Main Line is a 176.6 kilometer railway line owned by the West Japan Railway Company (JR West) connecting Maibara Station in Maibara, Shiga, with Naoetsu Station in Joetsu, Niigata. The section between Kanazawa Station and Naoetsu Station is now operated by third-sector railways. It serves the Hokuriku region on the northern central coast of Honshu, the largest island of Japan, as well as offering connections to the regions of Kansai, Tōkai, Kantō, and Tōhoku.

The section of the line between Maibara and Kanazawa is an important transportation artery along the Sea of Japan coast, because the Shinkansen high-speed network has not yet been extended through the Hokuriku region. As a result, narrow gauge limited expresses such as the Thunderbird and Shirasagi are common sights along the line.

The Hokuriku Main Line is double tracked and completely electrified: the section from Maibara to Tsuruga use 1,500 V DC power, while the section from Tsuruga to Kanazawa uses 20 kV AC, 60 Hz power.

JR Freight operated a small branch line for freight from Tsuruga Station to a container facility at the port of Tsuruga, but the services ceased in 2009.

Basic data
Operators, distances
West Japan Railway Company (Services and tracks)
Japan Freight Railway Company (Services)
From Maibara to Kanazawa: 

Stations:
Passenger stations: 43, including those with freight services
Freight terminals: 3
Double-track line: From Maibara to Kanazawa
Electrification: From Maibara to Kanazawa
From Maibara to Tsuruga: 1,500 V DC
From Tsuruga to Kanazawa: 20,000 V AC, 60 Hz
Railway signalling:
From Maibara to Kanazawa: Automatic train control

Maximum line speed: 130 km/h
CTC center:
From Maibara to Ōmi-Shiotsu: Shin-Ōsaka Operation Control Center
From Ōmi-Shiotsu to Kanazawa: Kanazawa Operation Control Center
CTC system:
From Maibara to Ōmi-Shiotsu: Safety Urban Network Traffic System (SUNTRAS)

Stations

Maibara - Tsuruga

 This entire section is electrified with direct current.

Tsuruga - Kanazawa 
Legend:
 ● : All Rapid trains stop
 ↑ : All Rapid trains pass (Only Tsuruga-bound Rapid trains are operated)

Kanazawa to Naoetsu
Now a third-sector railway, Kanazawa to Kurikara is IR Ishikawa Railway, Kurikara to Ichiburi is Ainokaze Toyama Railway, and Ichiburi to Naoetsu is Echigo Tokimeki Railway Nihonkai Hisui Line.

Rolling stock

Electric
 125 series (DC)
 221 series (DC)
 223-1000/2000 series (DC)
 225-0/100 series (DC)
 521-0 series (AC/DC)
 681 series (Thunderbird, Dinostar, Noto Kagaribi, Shirasagi, Ohayō Express, Oyasumi Express limited express)
 683 series (Thunderbird, Dinostar, Noto Kagaribi, Shirasagi, Ohayō Express, Oyasumi Express limited express)

Diesel
 KiHa 40/47
 KiHa 120

Former rolling stock
 413 series EMU (until March 2021)
 415-800 series EMU (until March 2011)
 419 series EMU (until March 2011)
 457 series EMU (until March 2015)
 471 series EMU (until March 2015)
 475 series EMU (until March 2015)
 485 series EMU (until March 2015)
 583 series EMU (Express Kitaguni until January 2013)

History

The entire line was built by the Japanese Government Railway, with the first section opened being from Nagahama, on the shore of Lake Biwa to Tsuruga in 1882. The Maibara to Nagahama section opened in 1889, and the line was then opened progressively to Fukui (in 1896), Kanazawa (in 1898), and Toyama (in 1899). The next extension opened to Uozu in 1908, and to Tomari in 1910. At the northeastern end, the Naoetsu to Nadachi section opened in 1911, and was extended to Itoigawa the following year. The final section opened in 1913, completing the line.

On 14 March 2015 the name of Terai Station was changed to Nomineagari Station.

Double-tracking and realignments
The initial section double-tracked was between Kanazawa and Tsubata in 1938, with the Maibara to Tsuruga section duplicated between 1957 and 1958. The rest of the line was double-tracked in stages between 1960 and 1969.

There have been three major line deviations. The first between Kinomoto and Tsuruga involving the 5,170 m Fukasaka tunnel opened in 1957 as a new line, with the original line remaining in service until the second new line opened in 1965, including the Shin-fukasaka tunnel at 5,173 m and a spiral section partially in tunnels to ease the ruling grade on the climb from Tsuruga to Biwako.

The second major deviation, between Tsuruga and Imajo opened in 1962 as a dual track line including the 13,870 m Hokuriku tunnel, providing a significantly straighter and faster line as well as avoiding numerous coastal sections vulnerable to disruption during severe weather events.

The third major deviation, the 21 km section between Uramoto and Arimagawa stations, was completed in 1969 as a dual track line, including the 11,353 m Kubiki tunnel, being the final section to be duplicated.

Electrification
The Tsuruga to Tamura section was electrified in 1957 at 20 kV AC. As Maibara was electrified at 1,500 V DC, steam locomotives hauled trains over the 5 km non-electrified section until it was electrified (at 1,500 V DC, with dual-voltage EMUs being used) in 1962, the year the 20 kV AC electrification was extended to Fukui, extending progressively to Kanazawa (in 1963), Toyama (in 1964), and Itoigawa (in 1965).

The Itoigawa to Naoetsu section was electrified at 1,500 V DC in 1969. DC was used in order to match the already-electrified Shin'etsu Main Line, which the Hokuriku Main Line joined at Naoetsu.

In 1991, in order to allow through-running with DC trains from the Tōkaidō Main Line at Maibara, the Tamura to Nagahama section was converted to 1,500 V DC, and the conversion was extended to Tsuruga in 2006.

Former connecting lines
 Tsuruga Station: The  freight-only line to Tsuruga-minato Port was taken out of service in 2009. The ~300m section of track from the former junction to the Maizakicho level crossing has since been removed to facilitate construction of the Hokuriku Shinkansen extension from Kanazawa to Tsuruga. This line utilised a Token system for safeworking.
 Takefu Station: The Takeoka Light Railway opened a 7 km  gauge line to Gobuichi in 1914, converting the line to  gauge in 1924, and extending it 7 km to Tono-guchi. In 1941, the company merged with the Fukui Railway, which electrified the line at 600 V DC in 1948. The last 5 km closed in 1971, and the rest of the line closed in 1981.
 Sabae Station: The Ura Electric Railway opened a 20 km line, electrified at 600 V DC, to Oda between 1926 and 1929. The line also connected to the Fukubu Line at Mizuochi. The company merged with the Fukui Railway in 1945. As a result of double-tracking work on the Hokuriku Line at Sabae, the section to Mizuochi closed in 1962, with the rest of the line closing in 1973.
 Maruoka Station: The Maruoka Railway opened a 4 km 762 mm gauge line to Shin-Maruoka in 1915. In 1930, it was regauged to 1,067 mm and electrified at 600 V DC in conjunction with the opening of the Eiheiji Line to Shin-Maruoka from Arawa Onsen. The following year, a 3 km electrified line was opened from Maruoka to Nishi Nagata on the Mikuni Awara Line. The company merged with the Keifuku Railway in 1944, and the entire 7 km line closed in 1968.
 Arawa Onsen Station: 
An 8 km line to Mikuni on the Mikuni Awara Line operated between 1911 and 1972.

The Eiheiji Railway Co. opened a 25 km line to its namesake town in 1929, connecting with the Katsuyama Eiheiji Line at Higashi-Furuichi. The company merged with the Keifuku Electric Railway Co. in 1944. The Arawa Onsen - Higashi-Furuichi section closed in 1969, and the section to Eijeihi closed in 2002 after a fatal head-on collision resulted in services being suspended and subsequently never resumed.

 Daishoji Station: A 9 km  gauge horse-drawn tramway opened to Yamanaka between 1898 and 1900. In 1913, the line was converted to 1,067 mm gauge and electrified. The line closed in 1971. The Hokuriku Railway Co. operated an 11 km line (known as the Contact Line) from Awazu Onsen (see Awazu station below) connected to the Uwano Line and this line between 1911 and 1963.
 Iburihashi Station: The Hokuriku Railway had two separate lines connecting here:
On the western side of the line, the 3 km line to Katayamazu opened in 1914 as a 915 mm gauge horse-drawn tramway. It was converted to 1,067 mm gauge and electrified in 1922, and closed in 1965.

On the eastern side, the 3 km electrified line to Uwano operated between 1911 and 1971.

 Awazu Station: The Awazu Onsen Railway opened a 4 km 762 mm gauge line to Awazu Onsen in 1911, converting the line to 1,067 mm gauge and electrifying it in 1916. The line closed in 1962.
 Komatsu Station: 
A 17 km 762 mm gauge line opened to the Ogoya copper mine between 1919 and 1920. The Meitetsu Railway took over management of the line in 1962, renaming the terminus Ogoya Onsen. The copper mine closed in 1971, and the line closed in 1977.

A 6 km horse-drawn tramway opened in 1906 to serve the Yusenji copper mine. Steam locomotion was introduced the following year, and the mine and line closed in 1918. In 1929, the line was regauged to 1,067 mm, electrified and reopened by the Hakusen Electric Railway, but it was declared bankrupt the following year. The Komatsu Electric Railway purchased the line at the receiver's auction in 1935, and merged with the Hokuriku Railway in 1945. Patronage declined from 2,126,000 in 1967 to 623,000 in 1983, and as a result the line closed in 1986.

 Terai Station (present-day Nomineagari Station): The Nomi Electric Railway opened a 17 km line, electrified at 600 V DC to Tsurugi on the Hokuriku Railroad Ishikawa Line in 1927. Flooding destroyed the Tedorigawa bridge in 1934, which was replaced nine months later. The company merged with the Hokuriku Railway in 1942. Freight services ceased in 1968, and the line closed in 1980.
 Matto station: In 1904, the 8 km, 915 mm gauge Matsukane horse-drawn tramway opened to Nomachi on the Hokuriku Railroad Ishikawa Line, and also connected with Nonoichi station on the same line (not the current JR West station of the same name, which opened in 1968), 3 km before the terminus. In 1916, the line was converted to 1,067 mm gauge and electrified at 600 V DC. The line was acquired by the Kanazawa Electric Railway in 1920, which merged with the Hokuriku Railway in 1942. The 3 km Nonoichi to Nomachi section closed in 1944, and the remaining 5 km line closed in 1955.
 Kanazawa Station: The 5 km 762 mm gauge Jinshi horse-drawn tramway opened in 1898, being converted to 1,067 mm gauge and electrified at 600 V DC in 1914. In 1920, the line was extended to Ono Port, and a further 2 km to Ono Minato in 1923. A 400m branch to Ryokuchi Park opened in 1930, passenger services on the branch ceasing in 1945 though the line remained to service a paper mill. The entire system closed in 1970.
 Isurugi Station: The Tonami Railway opened a 7 km line to Tsuzawa in 1915, and merged with the Kaetsu Railway in 1919, which extended the line 13 km to Shogawa-Cho in 1922, including a connection to the Johana Line at Fukuno. The line closed in 1972.
 Kurobe Station: The Toyo Aluminium Company planned to build Japan's first aluminium refinery near Kurobe, and in 1922 opened a line electrified at 600 V DC to the proposed refinery site. The refinery did not proceed, so the company extended the line to Ishida Minato to serve an Onsen. The line closed in 1940.

Hokuriku Shinkansen 
With the opening of the Hokuriku Shinkansen, control of local passenger services on the sections of the Hokuriku Main Line running through Ishikawa, Toyama, and Niigata prefectures was transferred to the following three third-sector operating companies owned by the respective prefectures.

 IR Ishikawa Railway (17.8 km,  - )
 Ainokaze Toyama Railway (100.1 km, Kurikara - )
 Echigo Tokimeki Railway Company Nihonkai Hisui Line (Ichiburi - )

References

This article incorporates material from the corresponding article in the Japanese Wikipedia

 
Lines of West Japan Railway Company
1067 mm gauge railways in Japan
Railway lines opened in 1882